Raif Husić (born 5 February 1996) is a Bosnian-German former professional footballer who played as a goalkeeper.

Career
Husić joined Regionalliga Bayern club Wacker Burghausen in the 2019 summer break in an attempt to regain professional fitness but left the club in mid-July with the intention to focus on his "job-related career".

References

External links
 

1996 births
Living people
People from Augsburg (district)
Sportspeople from Swabia (Bavaria)
German people of Bosnia and Herzegovina descent
German footballers
Footballers from Bavaria
Association football goalkeepers
Germany youth international footballers
FC Bayern Munich II players
SV Werder Bremen II players
SV Werder Bremen players
VfR Aalen players
SV Wacker Burghausen players
3. Liga players
Regionalliga players